Maria Felisa H. Batacan is a Filipino journalist and a writer of crime and mystery fiction. Her work has been published in the Philippines and abroad under the name F.H. Batacan.

Biography
She was a fellow at the 1996 Dumaguete National Writers' Workshop.

Batacan worked in the Philippine intelligence community and then became a broadcast journalist. She attended the University of the Philippines Diliman, where she pursued a master's degree in Arts Studies.  In 1999 her manuscript, Smaller and Smaller Circles, won the Don Carlos Palanca Memorial Awards for Literature Grand Prize for the English Novel. This novel was published in 2002 by the University of the Philippines Press.  Although most Filipino English-language fiction works garner a single print run of only 1,000 copies, Smaller and Smaller Circles had been reprinted four times by the year 2006, for a total of 6,000 copies.  The novel was one of the first Filipino works of crime fiction. 

The novel also won the 2002 Manila Critics’ Circle National Book Award and the Madrigal-Gonzales Best First Book Award in 2003. 

In 2008, she won 1st prize in the English short story category  of the Philippines Free Press Literary Awards.

In 2015, a new, expanded edition of the novel was published by Soho Press, New York.

References

Sources

External links
Soho Press book page 
Soho Press backgrounder 
Article on expanded edition 
Author interview 
Review 

Living people
Filipino women novelists
Filipino novelists
Year of birth missing (living people)